Raniero Nicolai (October 5, 1893 – April 2, 1958) was an Italian poet. He won a gold medal in the art competitions at the 1920 Olympic Games for his "Canzoni Olimpioniche" ("Olympic Songs").

References

Further reading
 Virginio Casciani, Raniero Nicolai: il poeta e l'opera, Associazione progresso studi morali e religiosi, Porfiri, 1958
 Melina Borelli (ed.), Le Olimpiadi, Milano, Garzanti, 1972, BNI 729649
 Antonino Fugardi, Storia delle Olimpiadi dalle origini al 1964, Bologna, Licinio Cappelli, 1967, BNI 695092
 Canfora, Luciano: Il sovversivo: Concetto Marchesi e il comunismo italiano. Gius. Laterza & Figli Spa, 2019. 
 Arnaud, Pierre & Riordan, Jim: Sport and International Politics: Impact of Facism and Communism on Sport, p. 161. Routledge, 2013

External links
 profile

1893 births
1958 deaths
Italian male poets
Olympic gold medalists in art competitions
20th-century Italian poets
Medalists at the 1920 Summer Olympics
20th-century Italian male writers
Olympic gold medalists for Italy
Olympic competitors in art competitions
Art competitors at the 1920 Summer Olympics